Cuba is scheduled to compete at the 2023 Pan American Games in Santiago, Chile from October 20 to November 5, 2023. This was Cuba's 19th appearance at the Pan American Games, having competed at every edition of the games since the inaugural edition in 1951.

Competitors
The following is the list of number of competitors (per gender) participating at the games per sport/discipline.

Archery

Cuba qualified two archers during the 2022 Pan American Archery Championships.

Men

Women

Canoeing

Sprint
Cuba qualified a total of 14 sprint athletes (seven men and seven women).

Men

Women

Cycling

Cuba qualified 1 cyclist at the Caribbean Championships.

Road
Women

Fencing

Cuba qualified a team of 4 fencers (three men and one woman), through the 2022 Pan American Fencing Championships in Ascuncion, Paraguay.

Individual

Team

Judo

Cuba has qualified two judokas (one man and one woman) after winning the categories at the 2021 Junior Pan American Games.

Men

Women

Modern pentathlon

Cuba qualified five modern pentathletes (three men and two women).

Shooting

Cuba qualified a total of 14 shooters in the 2022 Americas Shooting Championships.

Men
Pistol and rifle

Men
Shotgun

Women
Pistol and rifle

Softball

Cuba qualified a women's team (of 18 athletes) by virtue of its campaign in the 2022 Pan American Championships.

Summary

Volleyball

Indoor

Men's tournament

Cuba qualified a men's team (of 12 athletes) by winning the 2022 Men's Pan-American Volleyball Cup.

Summary

Wrestling

Cuba qualified five wrestlers (Men's Freestyle: 74 kg and 86 kg), (Greco-Roman: 97 kg), (Women's Freestyle: 50 kg and 68 kg) through the 2022 Pan American Wrestling Championships held in Acapulco, Mexico. Cuba also qualified nine wrestlers (Men's Freestyle: 57 kg and 97 kg), (Greco-Roman: 67 kg, 77 kg , 87 kg and 97 kg), (Women's Freestyle: 53 kg, 57 kg and 76 kg) by winning the 2021 Junior Pan American Games. 

Men

Women

See also
Cuba at the 2024 Summer Olympics

References

Nations at the 2023 Pan American Games
2023
2023 in Cuban sport